Seshagiri Rao ( – 18 November 2019) was an Indian politician belonging to Indian National Congress. He was a member of the Andhra Pradesh Legislative Assembly and Legislative Council.

Biography
Rao was the president of Bapatla Educational Society and established the Bapatla Engineering College. He was elected as a member of the Andhra Pradesh Legislative Council in 1981. He was elected as a member of the Andhra Pradesh Legislative Assembly as a Telugu Desam Party candidate from Bapatla in 1994. Later, he joined Indian National Congress. He served as the
president of the Guntur District Congress Committee and the secretary general of the Andhra Pradesh Congress Committee too.

Rao died on 18 November 2019 at the age of 86.

References

1930s births
2019 deaths
Telugu Desam Party politicians
Members of the Andhra Pradesh Legislative Council
Members of the Andhra Pradesh Legislative Assembly
People from Guntur district
Indian National Congress politicians from Andhra Pradesh